Micheal Flaherty is the co-founder and former president of Walden Media, a production company which focuses on films that entertain and educate. Through Walden, he has developed educational materials and programs that incite enthusiasm in the classroom and connect learning to entertainment.

Prior to founding Walden Media in 2001, Flaherty designed innovative curricula in the Boston Public School System, which captured national attention from The Wall Street Journal and The Boston Globe. He designed the curriculum and taught for the Steppingstone Magnet Program for students in the worst public school cluster in Boston. As a result of his curriculum, the percentage of minority students in the troubled school district who gained admissions to Boston's elite exam schools increased by more than 1000%.

As an author, Flaherty has been published in National Review, The Boston Business Journal and American Spectator. He also worked as a speechwriter for William Bulger, former President of the Massachusetts Senate, and Tom Reilly, the Massachusetts Attorney General. Flaherty is a graduate of Tufts University.

Flaherty lives in Lexington, Massachusetts with his wife, whom he married in October 1999, and their three children, who were previously homeschooled. He is an evangelical Christian.

References 

Living people
Year of birth missing (living people)
The American Spectator people
National Review people
American film producers